The Honduras national U-15 football team represents Honduras in tournaments and friendly matches at the Under-15 level.  They have won the CONCACAF Under-15 Championship once in 2013.

Tournament History

Record v other nations
 As of 17 August 2017
 Includes data from CONCACAF Under-15 Championship only

Honours
 CONCACAF Under-15 Championship
 Winners (1): 2013

References

Central American national under-15 association football teams
National under-15 association football teams
Under-15